The 2019 North Texas Mean Green football team represented the University of North Texas during the 2019 NCAA Division I FBS football season. The Mean Green played their home games at the Apogee Stadium in Denton, Texas, and competed in the West Division of Conference USA (C–USA).

Previous season
The Mean Green finished the 2018 season 9–4. North Texas 2019 commits ranked North Texas a number one in recruiting in the C-USA; 2018 recruiting class had been ranked number 9. North Texas 2018 senior Cornerback Nate Brooks has been selected to play in the NFLPA Collegiate Bowl. Jalen Guyton (Wide receiver) decided to forego a final year of play and declare for the NFL draft.

Recruiting
The highest ranked 2019 recruits were listed as three stars: DeShawn Gaddie (Cornerback) at 0.8473 (247sports.com), brothers Gabriel & Grayson Murphy (Outside Linebacker) at 0.8463 (247sports.com) and Khatib Lyles (Wide Receiver) at 0.8463 (247sports.com). The team had 19 three-star recruits, none of which were listed on ESPN 300. 247Sports, ESPN and Rivals all ranked UNT’s signing class as the best in the conference.

Preseason

CUSA media poll
Conference USA released their preseason media poll on July 16, 2019, with the Mean Green predicted to finish in first place in the West Division.

Preseason All-Conference USA teams
2019 Preseason All-Conference USA

North Texas had more offensive players selected than any team in the conference for the preseason all offensive team.

Schedule
North Texas announced its 2019 football schedule on January 10, 2019.  The 2019 schedule consists of 6 home and 6 away games in the regular season.  Unique to 2019 seasons across college football are the two bye weeks.  This as a result of an extra Saturday in the 2019 season.

Schedule Source:
Largest attendance recorded at Apogee Stadium.

Personnel

Coaching staff

Roster

Game summaries

Abilene Christian

at SMU

at California

UTSA

Houston

at Southern Miss

Middle Tennessee

at Charlotte

UTEP

at Louisiana Tech

at Rice

UAB

Statistics

Scoring
Scores against non-conference opponents

Scores against C-USA

Scores against all opponents

Awards

Coaching changes

Offensive coordinator, Graham Harrell will leave for USC and be the replacement for Kliff Kingsbury. Graham was  "a master of the film" and proponent of the "Air Raid" offense.

Eastern Washington offensive coordinator Bodie Reeder will join North Texas as offensive coordinator. Current N. Texas coach, Tommy Mainord will be promoted to be a co-offensive coordinator.

References

North Texas
North Texas Mean Green football seasons
North Texas Mean Green football